Christian Zillekens (born 29 December 1995 in Neuss) is a German modern pentathlete. He competed at the 2016 Summer Olympics in Rio de Janeiro, in the men's event. He finished in 21st place.

References

External links 
 
 
 
 

1995 births
Living people
German male modern pentathletes
Olympic modern pentathletes of Germany
Modern pentathletes at the 2016 Summer Olympics
Sportspeople from Neuss
21st-century German people